Rudolf Nana Kwasi Mensah Jr. (born 15 May 2001), is a Ghanaian professional footballer who plays as a forward for USL Championship club Birmingham Legion.

Career
In 2020, Mensah made two appearances and scored a single goal for Liberty Professionals before transferring to USL Championship side Birmingham Legion on 4 February 2020. He made his debut for Birmingham on 15 July 2020, appearing as a 71st-minute substitute in a 3–0 win over Memphis 901.

References

External links
 Birmingham Legion profile

2001 births
Living people
Ghanaian footballers
Association football forwards
Liberty Professionals F.C. players
Birmingham Legion FC players
Ghanaian expatriate footballers
Expatriate soccer players in the United States
USL Championship players